Uttarāmnāya Śrī Jyotish Pītham or Jyotir Math is one amongst the four cardinal pīthams established by the 820 CE philosopher-saint Śrī Ādi Śaṅkara to preserve and propagate Sanātana Dharma and Advaita Vedānta, the doctrine of non-dualism. Located in the city of Joshimath, Chamoli district, Uttarakhand, India, it is the uttarāmnāya matha or Northern Āmnāya Pītham, amongst the four Chaturamnaya Peethams, with the others being the Sringeri Śārada Pīṭhaṃ (Karnataka) in the South, Dvārakā Śāradā Pītham (Gujarat) in the West, Purī Govardhanmaṭha Pīṭhaṃ (Odisha) in the East. Its appointees bear the title of Shankaracharya. It is the headquarters of Giri, Parvata & Sagara sects of the Dasnami Sampradaya (monistic order). Their Vedantic mantra or Mahavakya is Ayamātmānam brahma (This Atman is supreme being) and as per the tradition initiated by Adi Shankara it holds authority over Atharva Veda. The head of the matha is called Shankarayacharya, the title derives from Adi Shankara.

After its occupation by Svāmī Rāmakṛṣṇa Tīrtha in the 18th century, it was leaderless for 165 years until the appointment of Swami Brahmananda Saraswati in 1941. Since Brahmananda's death in 1953, there have been several disciples and gurus who have been appointed, occupied or claimed to be the rightful occupant and leader of the monastery. This has led to multiple court cases and final settlement over the post is yet to be decided by the Court and consensus among dharmic leaders is yet to be established. Meanwhile, the Allahabad High Court had made Swami Swaroopanand Saraswati as caretaker shankaracharya of Joytirmath until a new shankaracharya is selected by a dharm shabha. After his death one of his disciple Swami Avimukteshwaranand was crowned as Shankaracharya of Joytirmath and occupies the asharam built by Swaroopand Saraswati in the Joytirmath city. However his coronation was stopped by Supreme Court of India after objection from Shankaracharya of Puri. While another claimant Swami Vasudevanad Saraswati who is also a member of Shri Ram Janmabhoomi Teerth Kshetra trust occupies the historical asharam built by Swami Brahmanand Saraswati in Joytirmath city. Deities worshipped in Jyotir Math are Lord Narayana and Shakti-Purnagiri.

History

Background
Jyotir Math is the uttaramnaya matha or northern monastery, one of four cardinal institutions established by Adi Shankara (c. As per Present seating, 145th Sankracharya of Puri Govardhan Math & the text of Puri Govardhan Math, Adi Sankara born in 507 BC, and in his 32-year age, Adi sankra established all four Math; Jyotir Math is one of the four math. In British regime, British assumed it to be 8th century, discarding the Sankracharya words & texts of math), the reviver of Vedic Sanatana Dharma. Shankara's four principal disciples, Padma-Pada, Hasta-Malaka, Suresvaracharya and Totakacharya were assigned to these four learning centers in the north, south, east and west of India. The subsequent leaders of each of these four monasteries have come to be known as Shankaracharyas, in honor of the math's founder, Adi Shankara. As such, they are the leaders of the Dasanami Saṃnyasins, who are considered to have custody of Advaita Vedānta These four principle seats of learning are located in Purī (Odisha), Shringeri (Karnataka) and Dwarka (Gujarat), with the northern (Uttaramnaya) monastery being located in the city of Jyotirmaṭh.

1900 to 1940
Jyotir Math was occupied by Swami Ramakrishna Tīrtha in the 18th century, but the monastery was inactive for 165 years following his death. During that time, a number of Gurus made claim to the Shankaracharya title and lawsuits representing the claimants and their representatives date back to the 1900s. For a time, the head priest, Raval, of the Badrinath temple was thought by some to hold the Shankaracharya title there. However, the formal occupation of the Matha only officially began when the leaders of the other three Mathas convinced Brahmananda Saraswati to accept the position.

1941 to 1953

The appointment of Brahmananda in 1941 was made by a group of monks and pandits based in the city of Varanasi  with the endorsement of Swami Bharati Krishna Tīitha, the Shankaracharya of Puri and Swami Chandrasekhara Bharati the Shankaracharya of Shringeri. Respected supporters of religious institutions, such as the rulers of the cities of Garhwal, Varanasi and Darbhanga, also endorsed Brahmananda, and their recognition helped overcome opposition from previous claimants to the title. Brahmandanda was also perceived by his supporters as the embodiment of the qualifications mentioned in Vedic texts, and this assisted in his unhindered ascension to the position at the age of 70.

Brahmananda was charged with reconstructing the temple and institution at Jyotir Math.   Through the assistance of the local Deputy Commissioner and parties responsible for his nomination, Brahmananda reclaimed the surrounding land that had been encroached upon by local farmers.  Under his leadership, a two-story, 30-room building was constructed to serve as the Peeth Bhawan of Jyotir Math. He also supervised the final construction of the Shrine of Purnagiri Devi about 100 yards in front of the new monastery, which "the Darbhanga ruler" had begun, but not completed, just prior to his death. Brahmanda's leadership was instrumental in re-establishing the Jyotir Math as "an important centre of traditional advaita teaching in northern India", and the monastery was visited by the president of India, Rajendra Prasad in December 1952.

1954 to present
After the death of Brahmananda in 1953, Swami Hariharananda Saraswati, a now deceased disciple of Brahmananda, was offered the title but refused to accept it. Later, it was revealed that five months before his death, Brahamananda had made a will and registered it with the District Registrar in Allahabad. The will named his disciple, Swami Shantanand Saraswati as his successor and Swami Dvarakesananda Saraswati, Swami Vishnudevananda Saraswati and Swami Paramatmananda Saraswati as alternate choices. As a result, Swami Shantanand Saraswati assumed the Shankarcharya-ship, but his authority was disputed by several of Brahmananda's disciples and followers who did not feel that Shantanand met the requirements described in the Mahanusasana texts. Meanwhile, others claimed that Brahmananda's death was due to poisoning, and that his will was not authentic, causing civil lawsuits to be filed by concerned parties.

Relevant organizations involved in reviving Jyotir Math, including a committee of pundits from Varanasi, proposed Swami Krishnabodha Asrama as the Shankaracharya, despite Shantanand's claim and occupation of Jyotir Math. Asrama died in 1973 and nominated his disciple Swaroopananda Saraswati, a disciple of Brahmananda, who had taken Swami Krishnabodha Ashrama as his guru after Brahmananda's death, as his successor. However, because Shantananda still occupied the Jyotir Math ashram built by Brahmananda, Swaroopananda took residence in a nearby building or ashram, said to be located near the former cave of Adi Shankara disciple, Trotakacharya.

During his tenure, Shantanand was "supportive" of another Brahamananda disciple, Maharishi Mahesh Yogi, and "often appeared with him in public". However, in 1980, Shantananda vacated the Shankarcharya position in favour of Swami Vishnudevananda Saraswati, an additional disciple that was named in Brahmananda's will as an alternate choice for the Shankaracharya-ship. Author Williamson writes that Shantanand was removed by the other Shankarcharya's due to his "incompetence" and speculates that his relationship with the Maharishi may have been a contributing factor. However, Shantanand's successor, Vishnudevananda, also spoke well of the Maharishi and publicly demonstrated his support by presiding over one of the Maharishi's publicized events in New Delhi in July 1986. Vishnudevananda died in 1989 and Swami Vasudevananda Saraswati succeeded him. Former Shankaracharya, Shantanand, then died in 1997.

Another claimant is Madhava Asrama, who disputes the lineage of Vasudevananda and Swaroopananda and who was appointed leader of Jyotir Math in the 1960s. He contends that Swaroopananda cannot accept the title of Shankaracharya for both the western and northern mathas, in which case the title reverts to a subsequent disciple of Krishnabodha Asrama. Madhava Asrama was reportedly appointed leader of Jyotir Math under the auspices of Shri Niranjana Deva Tirtha, who was the Shankarcharya of Puri at that time. However his appointment by made void and null by Allahabad High Court judgement.

These events have resulted in three separate lineages at Jyotir Math, despite Swarupananda being endorsed by other Adi Shankara mathas. These lineages include Swaroopananda Saraswati, the leader of the Dvaraka Math in the West, and Madhava Asrama (both disciples of Krishnabodha Asrama), as well as Vasudevananda Saraswati, who occupies the monastery built by Brahmananda in 1941.

A Sept. 23, 2017, court ruling held that both Shankaracharyas should step down and be replaced by another Swami within 3 months, noting  that Swami Shatanand had been made Shankaracharya of Jyotirmath Badrikashrama on June 12, 1953, by the then Shankaracharya, but that Swami Krishna Bodhashram was illegally appointed to the same post on June 25 that year. In the meantime, Swaroopananda was appointed caretaker by the ruling judge; a successor was not appointed then.

After the death of Swami Swaroopanand Saraswati, who was the Shankracharya of Dwarka Sharada Math, Swami Avimukteshwaranand Saraswati was made the Shankaracharya of Jyotirmath. His coronation was endorsed by Sringeri and Dwarka peeth shankaracharyas. Supreme Court stopped his coronation as the new shankaracharya after an affidavit was filed by Puri Shankaracharya. However many akhadas including Akhil Bhartiya Akhara Parishad and sadhus have not accepted his appointment as the new shankaracharya.

Swami Avimukteshwaranand took diksha from Swami Swaroopanand in 2006. Ever since, he had been supervising all religious and other activities of Uttarakhand-based Jyotir Math. He became the 46th shankaracharya of Jyotish Peeth. 
As a frequent visitor to Uttarakhand for years, Swami Avimukteshwaranand has cordial relations with all akhadas and ashrams, especially in Haridwar.

See also
 Adi Shankara           
 Shankaracharya         
Kalady, Kerala - the holy birthplace of Jagadguru Adi Shankaracharya
Govardhan Math Peetham (East), Puri, Orissa                                     
Dwarka Sharada Peetham (West), Dwarka, Gujarat                                    
Shri Sringeri Sharada Peetham (South), Sringeri, Karnataka                 
Shri Kanchi Kamakoti Peetham, Kancheepuram, Tamil Nadu

References

Shankaracharya mathas in India
Hindu temples in Uttarakhand
Religious organisations based in India
8th-century establishments in India
Chamoli district